Orvar or Örvar is a Nordic male given name, which means "arrow" in Old Norse. Örvar-Oddr ("arrow's point") is a legendary hero in a 13th-century Icelandic saga. The name may refer to:

Orvar Bergmark (1930–2004), Swedish football player and manager
Orvar Jönsson (born 1950), Swedish fencer
Orvar Lindwall (born 1941), Swedish fencer
Orvar Säfström (born 1974), Swedish film critic
Örvar Þóreyjarson Smárason (born 1977), Icelandic musician
Orvar Trolle (1900–1971), Swedish swimmer

References

Scandinavian masculine given names
Swedish masculine given names